Samuel Howard Capen (March 12, 1848 – May 24, 1943) was sheriff of Norfolk County, Massachusetts from 1898 to 1939.

Biography
Samuel Capen was born in Canton, Massachusetts on March 12, 1848.

He served as sheriff of Norfolk County, Massachusetts from 1898 to 1939.

He died at his home in Dedham on May 24, 1943, and was buried at Canton Corner Cemetery.

References

1848 births
American Unitarians
High Sheriffs of Norfolk County
1943 deaths